Autism in Love is an American documentary film released in 2015.

Synopsis
The film follows four adults with autism, focusing on love and adult relationships, and for two of the people, their relationships with their parents.

Dave and Lindsey, who both have autism, have been romantically involved for eight years. At the end of the film, they decide to get married.

Lenny is a young adult who lives with his single mother.

Stephen has been married for over 20 years. The film shows his struggles with his wife's terminal illness.

Release
The film premiered at the Tribeca Film Festival in April 2015.

It was also part of the PBS series Independent Lens in 2016.

Reception
The Huffington Post called the film "touching". The Daily Beast called it "bracingly intimate" and said that it "raises questions about love and life that strike a universal chord and have nothing to do with being on the [autism] spectrum."

See also
List of films about autism
Autism spectrum disorders in the media

References

External links

Autism in Love on Independent Lens

2015 films
American documentary films
2015 documentary films
Documentary films about autism
2010s English-language films
2010s American films
Films about disability